Coscurita is a municipality located in the province of Soria, Castile and León, Spain. According to the 2018 Municipal Register of Spain (INE), the municipality had a population of 79.

References

Municipalities in the Province of Soria